Paul Chequer is an English actor best known for starring in the British drama As If  as Jamie Collier on Channel 4 from 2001 to 2004 and the BBC Three drama Sinchronicity, as Nathan, in 2006.

He later appeared as Eugene Jones in the British science fiction television series Torchwood in the episode "Random Shoes", broadcast on 10 December 2006.

Background

Chequer graduated from Guildhall School of Music and Drama in 1998.

Born in 1978 in Portsmouth, Hampshire, Chequer also reads the Chivers Children's Audio book of Roderick Gordon and Brian William's "Tunnels" series.

He lives in London with his long standing partner and two sons.

Filmography

Notes and references

External links

English male television actors
Living people
Year of birth missing (living people)

1978 births